Being and Nothing is the fourth studio album by British extreme metal band Extreme Noise Terror. It was released in 2001 by Candlelight Records. It is the first and last to feature Adam Catchpole as a vocalist after Phil Vane left the band. The sound in this album leans more towards to death metal rather than their traditional crust punk roots.

Track listing
All Songs Written By Adam Catchpole, Dean Jones & Zac O'Neil, except where noted.

Personnel
Extreme Noise Terror
 Adam Catchpole - Vocals
 Dean Jones - Vocals
 Ali Firouzbakht - Guitar
 Manny Cooke - Bass
 Zac O'Neil - Drums

Session musicians
 Gian Pyres - Guitar

Production
 Mark Harwood - Producer, Engineering
 Dean Jones - Producer, Mixing
 Zac O'Neil - Producer, Mixing

References

2001 albums
Extreme Noise Terror albums
Deathgrind albums
Candlelight Records albums